Dalsøyra  is a village in the municipality of Gulen in Vestland county, Norway. The population of Dalsøyra (2001) was 213. Dalsøyra is an old fishing village, and today there is a school and a shop in the village.

References

External links

Dalsøyra school 

Villages in Vestland
Gulen